Osmar Sigueira Rodrigues (born 2 November 1988 in Diadema, São Paulo) is a Brazilian footballer who has played for a number of teams in Azerbaijan.

He used to play with Khazar Lankaran, leaving them to join Masalli in June 2007.

Sigueira played for Standard (Baku) in the 2008–09 Azerbaijan Premier League, including matches in October 2008 and April 2009.

He transferred to play for FC Standard from Brazil in November 2009.

Career statistics

References

1988 births
Living people
Brazilian footballers
FK Standard Sumgayit players
Brazilian expatriate footballers
Expatriate footballers in Azerbaijan
Brazilian expatriate sportspeople in Azerbaijan
Khazar Lankaran FK players
Association football forwards
FK Masallı players
Footballers from São Paulo (state)
People from Diadema